Igor Nikolayevich Yasulovich (born 24 September 1941) is a Soviet and Russian film and theater actor, film director and pedagogue.

Biography
Yasulovich was born in the village of Reinsfeld (now Zalesye) in Koshkinsky District of Kuybyshev Oblast. In 1962 he graduated from the cast, and then, in 1974, Directing Department Gerasimov Institute of Cinematography.

From 1962 he became an actor of experimental theater-studio pantomime, in 1964-1994 — Theatre studio of film actor, 1994 — Moscow Youth Theater.

He has played over 170 roles in cinema, his debut appearance being in En Route (1961), albeit uncredited.

Honours and awards

 Honoured Artist of the RSFSR (1988)
 State Prize of the Russian Federation (2000)
 People's Artist of Russia (2001)
 Order of Honour (2013)

Filmography

Actor
  En Route (В пути, 1961) as student-fellow traveler with baguettes (uncredited) 
Adventures of Krosh (Приключения Кроша, 1961) as dancer with glasses
Nine Days in One Year (Девять дней одного года, 1961) as Fedorov, physicist
 Time, Forward! (Время, вперёд!, 1965) as Vinkich
 Aybolit-66 (Айболит-66, 1966) as episode
 Major Whirlwind (Майор Вихрь, 1967) as Kurt Appel 
 The Golden Calf (Золотой телёнок, 1968) as young chauffeur 
 The Diamond Arm (Бриллиантовая рука, 1968) as dog owner
 The Shield and the Sword (Щит и меч, 1968) as Goga
 Waterloo (Ватерлоо, 1970) as episode
 The Twelve Chairs (Двенадцать стульев, 1971) as Ernest Shchukin, engineer
 Ilf and Petrov Rode a Tram (Ехали в трамвае Ильф и Петров, 1972) as Vasya the sculptor / Hans the sculptor
 It Can't Be! (Не может быть!, 1975) as Lyolik, the painting customer / guest at the wedding
 31 June (31 июня, 1978) as Master Jarvie / Dr. Jarvis
 The Very Same Munchhausen (Тот самый Мюнхгаузен, 1979) as Duke's Secretary
 Life Is Beautiful (Жизнь прекрасна, 1979) as prisoner
 Per Aspera Ad Astra (Через тернии к звездам, 1980) as Torki
 Mary Poppins, Goodbye (Мэри Поппинс, до свидания!, 1983) as Mr. Smith, the Park Keeper
 Guest from the Future (Гостья из будущего, 1985) as Electron Ivanovich, KosmoZoo employee
 The Most Charming and Attractive (Самая обаятельная и привлекательная, 1985) as huckster
 How to Become Happy (Как стать счастливым, 1986) as speaker at the opening of the monument
 Lilac Ball (Лиловый шар, 1987) as Koschei
 Mio in the Land of Faraway (Мио, мой Мио, 1987) as Eno / Carpetbeater
 Gardes-Marines, Ahead! (Гардемарины, вперёд!, 1988) as Korn 
 The Witches Cave (Подземелье ведьм, 1990) as Conrad Zhmuda, ethnographer
 The Russian Singer (Русская певица, 1993) as Pyotr Demichev
 Brezhnev (Брежнев, 2005) as Mikhail Suslov
 The State Counsellor (Статский советник, 2005) as Aronzon the chemist
 Adjutants of Love (Адъютанты любви, 2005) as Peter Ludwig von der Pahlen 
 Anyone but Them (Только не они, 2018) as scientist

Director
 Everyone Dreams about a Dog (1975)
 He is Missing and Found (1976)
 Hello, River! (1978)

References

External links

1941 births
20th-century Russian male actors
21st-century Russian male actors
Living people
People from Samara Oblast
Academicians of the Russian Academy of Cinema Arts and Sciences "Nika"
Gerasimov Institute of Cinematography alumni
Academic staff of the Gerasimov Institute of Cinematography
Honored Artists of the RSFSR
People's Artists of Russia
Recipients of the Order of Honour (Russia)
State Prize of the Russian Federation laureates
Russian film directors
Russian male film actors
Russian male stage actors
Russian male television actors
Russian male voice actors
Soviet film directors
Soviet male film actors
Soviet male stage actors
Soviet male television actors
Soviet male voice actors
Russian activists against the 2022 Russian invasion of Ukraine